The Romanian Social Party (PSRO) was a centre-left political party in Romania. It was founded in March 2015 by a number of former Social Democratic (PSD) MPs led by Mircea Geoană who was expelled from the PSD earlier that year. Geoană and his supporters claimed that the PSD under Victor Ponta "deviated from its left-wing identity" and supported a motion of no confidence launched by the opposition against the Ponta government (i.e. the fourth Ponta cabinet) in June 2015.

In Spring 2018, the party was officially dissolved.

References 

2015 establishments in Romania
2018 disestablishments in Romania
Political parties established in 2015
Political parties disestablished in 2018
Progressive parties
Social democratic parties in Romania